Air conditioning, often abbreviated as A/C (US), AC (US), or air con (UK), is the process of removing heat from an enclosed space to achieve a more comfortable interior environment (sometimes referred to as "comfort cooling") and in some cases also strictly controlling the humidity of internal air. Air conditioning can be achieved using a mechanical 'air conditioner' or alternatively a variety of other methods, including passive cooling or ventilative cooling. Air conditioning is a member of a family of systems and techniques that provide heating, ventilation, and air conditioning (HVAC). Heat pumps are similar in many ways to air conditioners, but use a reversing valve to allow them to heat and also cool an enclosed space.

Air conditioners, which typically use vapor-compression refrigeration, range in size from small units used within vehicles or single rooms to massive units that can cool large buildings. Air source heat pumps, which can be used for heating as well as cooling, are becoming increasingly common in cooler climates.

According to the International Energy Agency (IEA), as of 2018, 1.6 billion air conditioning units were installed, which accounted for an estimated 20% of electricity usage in buildings globally with the number expected to grow to 5.6 billion by 2050. The United Nations called for the technology to be made more sustainable to mitigate climate change and for the use of alternatives, like passive cooling, evaporative cooling, selective shading, windcatchers, and better thermal insulation. CFC and HCFC refrigerants such as R-12 and R-22, respectively, used within air conditioners have caused damage to the ozone layer, and HFC refrigerants such as R-410a and R-404a, which were designed to replace CFCs and HCFCs, are instead exacerbating climate change. Both issues happen due to the venting of refrigerant to the atmosphere, such as during repairs. HFO refrigerants, used in some if not most new equipment, solve both issues with an ozone damage potential (ODP) of zero and a much lower global warming potential (GWP) in the single or double digits vs. the three or four digits of HFCs.

History
Air conditioning dates back to prehistory. Ancient Egyptian buildings used a wide variety of passive air-conditioning techniques. These became widespread from the Iberian Peninsula through North Africa, the Middle East, and Northern India.

Passive techniques remained widespread until the 20th century, when they fell out of fashion, replaced by powered air conditioning. Using information from engineering studies of traditional buildings, passive techniques are being revived and modified for 21st-century architectural designs.

Air conditioners allow the building's indoor environment to remain relatively constant largely independent of changes in external weather conditions and internal heat loads. They also allow deep plan buildings to be created and have allowed people to live comfortably in hotter parts of the world.

Development

Preceding discoveries

In 1558, Giambattista della Porta described a method of chilling ice to temperatures far below its freezing point by mixing it with potassium nitrate (then called "nitre") in his popular science book Natural Magic. In 1620, Cornelis Drebbel demonstrated "Turning Summer into Winter" for James I of England, chilling part of the Great Hall of Westminster Abbey with an apparatus of troughs and vats. Drebbel's contemporary Francis Bacon, like della Porta a believer in science communication, may not have been present at the demonstration, but in a book published later the same year, he described it as "experiment of artificial freezing" and said that "Nitre (or rather its spirit) is very cold, and hence nitre or salt when added to snow or ice intensifies the cold of the latter, the nitre by adding to its own cold, but the salt by supplying activity to the cold of the snow."

In 1758, Benjamin Franklin and John Hadley, a chemistry professor at University of Cambridge, conducted an experiment to explore the principle of evaporation as a means to rapidly cool an object. Franklin and Hadley confirmed that the evaporation of highly volatile liquids (such as alcohol and ether) could be used to drive down the temperature of an object past the freezing point of water. They conducted their experiment with the bulb of a mercury-in-glass thermometer as their object and with a bellows used to speed up the evaporation. Franklin concluded: "From this experiment one may see the possibility of freezing a man to death on a warm summer's day."

The 19th century included a number of developments in compression technology. In 1820, English scientist and inventor Michael Faraday discovered that compressing and liquefying ammonia could chill air when the liquefied ammonia was allowed to evaporate. In 1842, Florida physician John Gorrie used compressor technology to create ice, which he used to cool air for his patients in his hospital in Apalachicola, Florida. He hoped to eventually use his ice-making machine to regulate the temperature of buildings and envisioned centralized air conditioning that could cool entire cities. Gorrie was granted a patent in 1851, but following the death of his main backer he was not able to realise his invention. In 1851, James Harrison created the first mechanical ice-making machine in Geelong, Australia, and was granted a patent for an ether vapor-compression refrigeration system in 1855 that produced three tons of ice per day. In 1860, Harrison established a second ice company and later entered the debate over how to compete against the American advantage of ice-refrigerated beef sales to the United Kingdom.

First devices

Electricity made development of effective units possible. In 1901, American inventor Willis H. Carrier built what is considered the first modern electrical air conditioning unit. In 1902, he installed his first air-conditioning system, in the Sackett-Wilhelms Lithographing & Publishing Company in Brooklyn, New York; his invention controlled both the temperature and humidity which helped maintain consistent paper dimensions and ink alignment at the printing plant. Later, together with six other employees, Carrier formed The Carrier Air Conditioning Company of America, a business that in 2020 employed 53,000 people and was valued at $18.6 billion.

In 1906, Stuart W. Cramer of Charlotte, North Carolina was exploring ways to add moisture to the air in his textile mill. Cramer coined the term "air conditioning", using it in a patent claim he filed that year as analogous to "water conditioning", then a well-known process for making textiles easier to process. He combined moisture with ventilation to "condition" and change the air in the factories, controlling the humidity so necessary in textile plants. Willis Carrier adopted the term and incorporated it into the name of his company.

Domestic air conditioning soon took off. In 1914, the first domestic air conditioning was installed in Minneapolis in the home of Charles Gilbert Gates. It is however possible that the huge device (c. 7 x 6 x 20 ft) was never used, as the house remained uninhabited (Gates had already died in October 1913).

In 1931, H.H. Schultz and J.Q. Sherman developed what would become the most common type of individual room air conditioner: one designed to sit on a window ledge. The units went on sale in 1932 at a considerable price (the equivalent of $120,000 to $600,000 in 2015 dollars.) A year later the first air conditioning systems for cars were offered for sale. Chrysler Motors introduced the first practical semi-portable air conditioning unit in 1935, and Packard became the first automobile manufacturer to offer an air conditioning unit in its cars in 1939.

Further development
Innovations in the latter half of the 20th century allowed for much more ubiquitous air conditioner use. In 1945, Robert Sherman of Lynn, Massachusetts invented a portable, in-window air conditioner that cooled, heated, humidified, dehumidified, and filtered the air. 

As international development has increased wealth across countries, global use of air conditioners has increased. By 2018, an estimated 1.6 billion air conditioning units were installed worldwide, with the International Energy Agency expecting this number to grow to 5.6 billion units by 2050. Between 1995 and 2004, the proportion of urban households in China with air conditioners increased from 8% to 70%. As of 2015, nearly 100 million homes, or about 87% of US households, had air conditioning systems. In 2019, it was estimated that 90% of new single-family homes constructed in the USA included air conditioning (ranging from 99% in the South to 62% in the West).

Types of air conditioner

Mini-split and multi-split systems

Ductless systems (often mini-split, though there are now ducted mini-split) typically supply conditioned and heated air to a single or a few rooms of a building, without ducts and in a decentralized manner. Multi-zone or multi-split systems are a common application of ductless systems and allow up to eight rooms (zones or locations) to be conditioned independently from each other, each with its own indoor unit and simultaneously from a single outdoor unit. The main problem with multi-split systems is the length of the refrigerant lines for connecting the external unit to the internal ones. Central air conditioners face the same challenge.

The first mini-split systems were sold in 1954–1968 by Mitsubishi Electric and Toshiba in Japan, where small home size motivated their development. Multi-zone ductless systems were invented by Daikin in 1973, and variable refrigerant flow systems (which can be thought of as larger multi-split systems) were also invented by Daikin in 1982. Both were first sold in Japan. Variable refrigerant flow systems when compared with central plant cooling from an air handler, eliminate the need for large cool air ducts, air handlers, and chillers; instead cool refrigerant is transported through much smaller pipes to the indoor units in the spaces to be conditioned, thus allowing for less space above dropped ceilings and a lower structural impact, while also allowing for more individual and independent temperature control of spaces, and the outdoor and indoor units can be spread across the building. Variable refrigerant flow indoor units can also be turned off individually in unused spaces. The lower start-up power of VRF's DC inverter compressors and their inherent DC power requirements also allow VRF solar-powered heat pumps to be run using DC-providing solar panels.

Ducted central systems
Split-system central air conditioners consist of two heat exchangers, an outside unit (the condenser) from which heat is rejected to the environment and an internal heat exchanger (the fan coil unit (FCU), air handling unit, or evaporator) with the piped refrigerant being circulated between the two. The FCU is then connected to the spaces to be cooled by ventilation ducts.

Central plant cooling

Large central cooling plants may use intermediate coolant such as chilled water pumped into air handlers or fan coil units near or in the spaces to be cooled which then duct or deliver cold air into the spaces to be conditioned, rather than ducting cold air directly to these spaces from the plant, which is not done due to the low density and heat capacity of air which would require impractically large ducts. The chilled water is cooled by chillers in the plant, which uses a refrigeration cycle to cool water, often transferring its heat to the atmosphere even in liquid-cooled chillers through the use of cooling towers. Chillers may be air or liquid-cooled.

Portable units
A portable system has an indoor unit on wheels connected to an outdoor unit via flexible pipes, similar to a permanently fixed installed unit (such as a ductless split air conditioner).

Hose systems, which can be monoblock or air-to-air, are vented to the outside via air ducts. The monoblock type collects the water in a bucket or tray and stops when full. The air-to-air type re-evaporates the water and discharges it through the ducted hose and can run continuously. Such portable units draw indoor air and expel it outdoors through a single duct, which negatively impacts their overall cooling efficiency.

Many portable air conditioners come with heat as well as a dehumidification function.

Window unit and packaged terminal

The packaged terminal air conditioner (PTAC), through-the-wall, and window air conditioners are similar. PTAC systems may be adapted to provide heating in cold weather, either directly by using an electric strip, gas, or other heaters, or by reversing the refrigerant flow to heat the interior and draw heat from the exterior air, converting the air conditioner into a heat pump. They may be installed in a wall opening with the help of a special sleeve on the wall and a custom grill that is flush with the wall and window air conditioners can also be installed in a window, but without a custom grill.

Packaged air conditioner
Packaged air conditioners (also known as self-contained units) are central systems that integrate into a single housing all the components of a split central system, and deliver air, possibly through ducts, to the spaces to be cooled. Depending on their construction they may be outdoors or indoors, on roofs (rooftop units), draw the air to be conditioned from inside or outside a building and be water, refrigerant or air-cooled. Often, outdoor units are air-cooled while indoor units are liquid-cooled using a cooling tower.

Operation

Operating principles

Cooling in traditional air conditioner systems is accomplished using the vapor-compression cycle, which uses the forced circulation and phase change of a refrigerant between gas and liquid to transfer heat. The vapor-compression cycle can occur within a unitary, or packaged piece of equipment; or within a chiller that is connected to terminal cooling equipment (such as a fan coil unit in an air handler) on its evaporator side and heat rejection equipment such as a cooling tower on its condenser side. An air source heat pump shares many components with an air conditioning system, but includes a reversing valve which allows the unit to be used to heat as well as cool a space.

Air conditioning equipment will reduce the absolute humidity of the air processed by the system if the surface of the evaporator coil is significantly cooler than the dew point of the surrounding air. An air conditioner designed for an occupied space will typically achieve a 30% to 60% relative humidity in the occupied space.

Most modern air-conditioning systems feature a dehumidification cycle during which the compressor runs while the fan is slowed to reduce the evaporator temperature and therefore condense more water. A dehumidifier uses the same refrigeration cycle but incorporates both the evaporator and the condenser into the same air path; the air first passes over the evaporator coil where it is cooled and dehumidified before passes over the condenser coil where it is warmed again before being released back into the room again.

Free cooling can sometimes be selected when the external air happens to be cooler than the internal air and therefore the compressor needs not be used, resulting in high cooling efficiencies for these times. This may also be combined with seasonal thermal energy storage.

Heating 

Some air conditioning systems have the option to reverse the refrigeration cycle and act as air source heat pump, therefore producing heating instead of cooling in the indoor environment. They are also commonly referred to as "reverse cycle air conditioners". The heat pump is significantly more energy-efficient than electric resistance heating, because it moves energy from air or groundwater to the heated space, as well as the heat from purchased electrical energy. When the heat pump is in heating mode, the indoor evaporator coil switches roles and becomes the condenser coil, producing heat. The outdoor condenser unit also switches roles to serve as the evaporator and discharges cold air (colder than the ambient outdoor air).

Most air source heat pumps become less efficient in outdoor temperatures lower than 4°C or 40°F; this is partly because ice forms on the outdoor unit's heat exchanger coil, which blocks air flow over the coil. To compensate for this, the heat pump system must temporarily switch back into the regular air conditioning mode to switch the outdoor evaporator coil back to being the condenser coil, so that it can heat up and defrost. Some heat pump systems will therefore have a form of electric resistance heating in the indoor air path that is activated only in this mode in order to compensate for the temporary indoor air cooling, which would otherwise be uncomfortable in the winter.

However there is always a chance that the humidity that condenses on the heat exchanger of the outdoor unit could freeze, even in models that have improved cold-weather performance, requiring a defrosting cycle to be performed.

The icing problem becomes much more severe with lower outdoor temperatures, so heat pumps are sometimes installed in tandem with a more conventional form of heating, such as an electrical heater, a natural gas, heating oil, or wood-burning fireplace or central heating, which is used instead of or in addition to the heat pump during harsher winter temperatures. In this case, the heat pump is used efficiently during milder temperatures, and the system is switched to the conventional heat source when the outdoor temperature is lower.

Performance

The coefficient of performance (COP) of an air conditioning system is a ratio of useful heating or cooling provided to the work required. Higher COPs equate to lower operating costs. The COP usually exceeds 1; however, the exact value is highly dependent on operating conditions, especially absolute temperature and relative temperature between sink and system, and is often graphed or averaged against expected conditions. Air conditioner equipment power in the U.S. is often described in terms of "tons of refrigeration," with each approximately equal to the cooling power of one short ton ( of ice melting in a 24-hour period. The value is equal to 12,000 BTUIT per hour, or 3,517 watts. Residential central air systems are usually from 1 to 5 tons (3.5 to 18 kW) in capacity.

The efficiency of air conditioners is often rated by the seasonal energy efficiency ratio (SEER) which is defined by the Air Conditioning, Heating, and Refrigeration Institute in its 2008 standard AHRI 210/240, Performance Rating of Unitary Air-Conditioning and Air-Source Heat Pump Equipment. A similar standard is the European seasonal energy efficiency ratio (ESEER).

Impact

Health effects
In hot weather, air conditioning can prevent heat stroke, dehydration from excessive perspiration, and other problems related to hyperthermia. Heat waves are the most lethal type of weather phenomenon in the United States. Air conditioning (including filtration, humidification, cooling and disinfection) can be used to provide a clean, safe, hypoallergenic atmosphere in hospital operating rooms and other environments where proper atmosphere is critical to patient safety and well-being. It is sometimes recommended for home use by people with allergies, especially mold.

Poorly maintained water cooling towers can promote the growth and spread of microorganisms such as Legionella pneumophila, the infectious agent responsible for Legionnaires' disease. As long as the cooling tower is kept clean (usually by means of a chlorine treatment), these health hazards can be avoided or reduced. The state of New York has codified requirements for registration, maintenance, and testing of cooling towers to protect against Legionella.

Environmental impacts
Refrigerants have caused and continue to cause serious environmental issues, including ozone depletion and climate change, as several countries have not yet ratified the Kigali Amendment to reduce the consumption and production of hydrofluorocarbons.

Current air conditioning accounts for 20% of energy consumption in buildings globally, and the expected growth of the usage of air conditioning due to climate change and technology uptake will drive significant energy demand growth. Alternatives to continual air conditioning include passive cooling, passive solar cooling, natural ventilation, operating shades to reduce solar gain, using trees, architectural shades, windows (and using window coatings) to reduce solar gain.

In 2018 the United Nations called for the technology to be made more sustainable to mitigate climate change.

Economic effects 
Air conditioning caused various shifts in demography, notably that of the United States starting from the 1970s:

 The birth rate was lower in the spring than during other seasons until the 1970s but this difference then declined over the next 30 years.
 The summer mortality rate, which had been higher in regions subject to a heatwave during the summer, also evened out.
 The Sun Belt now contains 30% of the total US population while it was inhabited by 24% of Americans at the beginning of the 20th century.

First designed to benefit targeted industries such as the press as well as large factories, the invention quickly spread to public agencies and administrations with studies with claims of increased productivity close to 24% in places equipped with air conditioning.

Other techniques
Buildings designed with passive air conditioning are generally less expensive to construct and maintain than buildings with conventional HVAC systems with lower energy demands. While tens of air changes per hour, and cooling of tens of degrees, can be achieved with passive methods, site-specific microclimate must be taken into account, complicating building design.

Many techniques can be used to increase comfort and reduce the temperature in buildings. These include evaporative cooling, selective shading, wind, thermal convection, and heat storage.

Passive ventilation

Passive cooling

Daytime radiative cooling 

Passive daytime radiative cooling (PDRC) surfaces reflect incoming solar radiation and heat back into outer space through the infrared window for cooling during the daytime. Daytime radiative cooling became possible with the ability to suppress solar heating using photonic structures, which emerged through a study by Raman et al. (2014). PDRCs can come in a variety of forms, including paint coatings and films, that are designed to be high in solar reflectance and thermal emittance. 

PDRC applications on building roofs and envelopes have demonstrated significant decreases in energy consumption and costs. In suburban single-family residential areas, PDRC application on roofs can potentially lower energy costs by 26% to 46%. PDRCs are predicted to show a market size of ∼$27 billion for indoor space cooling by 2025 and have undergone a surge in research and development since the 2010s.

Fans 

Hand fans have existed since prehistory. Large human-powered fans built into buildings include the punkah.

The 2nd-century Chinese inventor Ding Huan of the Han Dynasty invented a rotary fan for air conditioning, with seven wheels  in diameter and manually powered by prisoners. In 747, Emperor Xuanzong (r. 712–762) of the Tang Dynasty (618–907) had the Cool Hall (Liang Dian ) built in the imperial palace, which the Tang Yulin describes as having water-powered fan wheels for air conditioning as well as rising jet streams of water from fountains. During the subsequent Song Dynasty (960–1279), written sources mentioned the air conditioning rotary fan as even more widely used.

Thermal buffering
In areas that are cold at night or in winter, heat storage is used. Heat may be stored in earth or masonry; air is drawn past the masonry to heat or cool it.

In areas that are below freezing at night in winter, snow and ice can be collected and stored in ice houses for later use in cooling. This technique is over 3,700 years old in the Middle East. Harvesting outdoor ice during winter and transporting and storing for use in summer was practiced by wealthy Europeans in the early 1600s, and became popular in Europe and the Americas towards the end of the 1600s. This practice was replaced by mechanical compression-cycle ice-making machines (see below).

Evaporative cooling

In dry, hot climates, the evaporative cooling effect may be used by placing water at the air intake, such that the draft draws air over water and then into the house. For this reason, it is sometimes said that the fountain, in the architecture of hot, arid climates, is like the fireplace in the architecture of cold climates. Evaporative cooling also makes the air more humid, which can be beneficial in a dry desert climate.

Evaporative coolers tend to feel as if they are not working during times of high humidity, when there is not much dry air with which the coolers can work to make the air as cool as possible for dwelling occupants. Unlike other types of air conditioners, evaporative coolers rely on the outside air to be channeled through cooler pads that cool the air before it reaches the inside of a house through its air duct system; this cooled outside air must be allowed to push the warmer air within the house out through an exhaust opening such as an open door or window.

See also

 Air conditioned clothing
 Crankcase heater
 Deep water source cooling
 Energy recovery ventilation
 Energy label
 Ground-coupled heat exchanger
 Hydronics
 Ice storage air conditioning
 List of home appliances
 Louver
 Trombe wall
 Thermoacoustic refrigerator
 Uniform Mechanical Code
 Working fluid
 Cromer cycle

References

External links

  Carrier's original patent
 
 
 Scientific American, "Artificial Cold", 28 August 1880, p. 138
 Scientific American, "The Presidential Cold Air Machine", 6 August 1881, p. 84

1902 introductions
American inventions
Ancient Egyptian technology
Ancient Roman technology
Building automation
Chinese inventions
Cooling technology
Dutch inventions
Gas technologies
Home appliances